Suur-Tapiola ("Greater Tapiola") is a south-eastern main district of Espoo, a city in Finland.

It contains the districts Haukilahti, Laajalahti, Mankkaa, Niittykumpu, Otaniemi, Pohjois-Tapiola, Tapiola and Westend.

See also 

 Districts of Espoo

Districts of Espoo